Harry Gregory may refer to:

 Harry Gregory (Australian footballer) (1902–1993), Australian rules footballer
 Harry Gregory (footballer, born 1943) (1943–2016), English football midfielder

See also
Henry Gregory (disambiguation)